The L. N. Gumilev Eurasian National University (ENU), is a Kazakh national research university, and the largest higher education institution in Astana.

The university was founded on 23 May 1996 as the result of a merger of Akmola Civil Engineering Institute and Akmola Pedagogical Institute. It was named L. N. Gumilev Eurasian University in honour of the idea of the Eurasian Union and Lev Gumilev, a historian and ethnologist, one of the founders of the Eurasianism concept. As the result of a merger with the Academy of Diplomacy of Ministry of International Relations of Kazakhstan in 2000, it was renamed L. N. Gumilev Eurasian State University, and in 2001, the university gained national university status and was renamed L. N. Gumilev Eurasian National University.

ENU provides undergraduate and graduate instruction in the humanities, social sciences, natural sciences, engineering and military science.

In 2021, the L. N. Gumilev Eurasian National University was named as one of the Top 500 Universities in the World.

ENU includes 28 scientific institutions (research institutes, laboratories, centers), 13 schools, the Military Department, and cultural and educational centers of different countries. The system of specialist training at the university is conducted on 3 levels of education: basic higher education (Bachelor's programme, the Master's programme and Ph.D. doctorate).

Admission to ENU is carried out on the basis of state educational grants and on a contractual basis. The university offers 65 Bachelor's programs, 68 Master's programs and 38 PhD programs.

History 

ENU was founded on 23 May 1996, on the initiative of Nursultan Nazarbayev, the president of the Republic of Kazakhstan, on the basis of joining of two universities, Akmola Civil Engineering Institute and Akmola Pedagogical Institute. The university was granted a special status of national by the Presidential Decree from 5 July 2001, “considering the significant contribution to the development and professional formation of a person on the basis of national and universal values, science and technology”. It is highly symbolic that the university was in honour of a historian and ethnologist, one of the founders of the Eurasianism concept, Lev Gumilev.

Key documents 

 Decree of the President of the Republic of Kazakhstan on L. N. Gumilev Eurasian University  (23 May 1996)
 Resolution of the Government of the Republic of Kazakhstan (24 October 2000, no. 1589)
 Resolution of the Government of the Republic of Kazakhstan on renaming of several higher educational institutions  (29 June 2001, no. 892)
 Decree of the President of the Republic of Kazakhstan on conferring of special status to individual state institutions of higher education  (5 July 2001, no. 648)
 Decree of the President of the Republic of Kazakhstan on issues of state higher educational institutions, the first heads of which are appointed to positions and relieved by the president of the republic Kazakhstan (21 April 2008, no. 573)
 The charter of the Republican state enterprise “L.N. Gumilev Eurasian National University” of the Ministry of Education and Science of the Republic of Kazakhstan approved by the Order of the chairman of the Committee of State Property and Privatization of the Ministry of Finance of the Republic of Kazakhstan (3 September 2009, no. 483)
 Certificate ISO 9001:2000.

Key dates 

ENU has been considered a higher educational institution of the international level since 2000.
Kazakh Branch of the Moscow State University was opened on the basis of the Eurasian National University in 2000.
Study-Museum of Lev Gumilev was opened at ENU on the initiative of Myrzatai Zholdasbekov, Rector, on 1 October 2002.
The bust of the Eurasian was mounted at educational and administrative building of ENU in September 2008.
XI Congress of the Eurasian Association of Universities was held in ENU at 10 March 2009.
In 2012, the Eurasian National University will become the Centre of Commemorative Celebrations, devoted to the 100th anniversary of the birth of Lev Gumilev.

International Rankings 

 QS World University Ranking - 418
 QS Top 50 Under 50 - 35 
 University Ranking by Academic Performance - 1893 
 Webometrics Ranking of World Universities - 1895 
 QS Emerging Europe and Central Asia University Ranking - 33 
 QS Ranking by Subjects “Physics & Astronomy” - топ-500

Schools 

School of Information Technologies
School of Natural Sciences
School of Economics
School of Philology
School of Law
School of Mechanics and Mathematics
School of Journalism and Political Science 
School of Transport and Energy
School of Architecture and Construction
School of International Relations
School of Physics and Technical Sciences
School of Social Sciences
School of History
Military Department

Research units

Engineering-technical 

Geotechnical Scientific Research Institute
Expert Scientific Research Institute
"Technology, mechanization and automation of building and transport processes" Research and Design Laboratory

Natural-technical

The Eurasian Mathematical Institute
Institute of Theoretical Mathematics and Scientific Computations
Institute for Basic Research
Institute of Physics and High Technologies
Eurasian International Center of Theoretical Physics
The Research Institute of Bioorganic Chemistry
Institute of Cell Biology and Biochemical Technology
Institute of Experimental Biology and Ecology
Engineering Laboratory of the L. N.Gumilev Eurasian National University

Social-humanitarian 

Eurasia Research Centre of Humanitarian Researches
Otyrar Library Research Centre
Alash Institute of Culture and Spiritual Heritage
K.A.Akishev Research Institute of Archeology
Konfusyi Institute
Turkology and Altaistics Research Centre
Laboratory of Intercultural Communication and Applied Linguistics

Social-economic 
Laboratory for Sociology and Urban Studies
RSI Legal Research and Expertise of Draft Law
Institute on Research of Problems of Journalism
Econometrics Scientifically and Research Laboratory
Center for International and Regional Studies
Institute of Modern Research

International cooperation 
International cooperation of ENU is based on 268 contracts with universities-partners in Europe, Asia, America, 23 scientific centers and research institutes, as well as embassies, international scientific and educational funds.
ENU cooperates with programists as Mr.Serik from NIS and universities as Cambridge, University Sussex, Lomonosov Moscow State University, Bologna University, Berlin Technical University, University of Valenciennes, Busan University, Wuhan University, University of Calgary, etc.

ENU is a full member of international associations and consortiums:
 Eurasian Association of Universities 
 IREG Observatory on Academic Ranking and Excellence
 Observatory Magnum Charter Universitatum
 Network University of CIS 
 University of Shanghai Cooperation Organization 
 Consortium of European countries' universities
 United Nations Academic Impact (UNAI)
 STAR-NET
 Turkic Universities Council
 National Inter-university Consortium for Telecommunication
 Association of Asian Universities

Museums

Museum of Turkic Script

The Museum of Turkic Script of ENU is a scientific, educational-auxiliary and cultural-educational unit of the university. It opened on September 18, 2003.  Exhibits of the museum of the history of Turkic script are focused on learning the history of letters. Gathered here is the rich heritage of world culture-samples used by Turkic peoples of the Eurasian space. The co-founders of the nomadic Eurasian civilization of Turkic peoples in history have suggested the idea of "Eternal Ale". They spoke the 26 related languages that originated from one root, and used 16 writing systems since ancient times. The first Turkic words were recorded in letters and became the basis for the further evolution of the Turkic language system back in the 5th and 4th centuries BC. Among the valuable exhibits of the museum are inscriptions on stones of different periods, from the Kangly era (2nd century BC) until the 19th century. They were brought from Mongolia, Xian, and Altay.

Study-museum of Lev Gumilev 

Study-museum of Lev Gumilev at the university opened on October 1, 2002. Investigators of the scholar's creativity, such as E.Dilmukhamedova, M.Novgorodova, M.Kozyreva, V.Bilichenko, E.Maslova, assisted in the establishment of the museum. In 2004, Nataliya Gumileva, Lev Gumilev's wife, bequeathed to the Eurasian National University the Moscow Office of the scientist: a desktop, a printing machine where the scientist published his works (“Continental”), an arm-chair, a bookcase, books, photographs and various memorial objects (sculptures, vases, bottles).

The foundation of the study-museum contains personal records and books from the personal library of Lev Gumilev, books that he authored (a treatise «Этногенез и биосфера Земли» (“Ethnogenesis and the biosphere of the Earth”), «Степная Трилогия» (“Steppe Trilogy”), «Древняя Русь и Великая степь» (“Ancient Rus and Great steppe”), «Открытие Хазарии» (“Discovery of Hazariya”), «Тысячелетие вокруг Каспия» (“Millennium around the Caspian Sea”), «Арабески истории» (“Arabesque of history”, etc.), photographs of various archaeological expeditions, films about the scientist, video tapes with records of tele-cycles on the history of the Turkic peoples and peoples of Central Asia and the funeral of Lev Gumilev (June 20, 1992). The study-museum is attended annually by dozens of foreign delegations, hundreds of thousands of statesmen, scientists, students, young researchers. The museum room is used as the acting laboratory of the Department of Eurasian Studies. On October 1, 2012, the university is going to celebrate the 100th anniversary of the birth of the scientist, the author of the theory of passionarism Lev Gumilev.

Rectors 

Amangeldi Kussainov (1996–2000)
Myrzatai Zholdasbekov (2000–2004)
Sarsengali Abdimanapov (2004–2008)
Bakhytzhan Abdraim (2008–2011)
Yerlan Sydykov (2011–present)

Notes

External links

  

1996 establishments in Kazakhstan
Educational institutions established in 1996
L. N. Gumilyov Eurasian National University